The United States Military Government in Cuba (Spanish: Gobierno militar estadounidense en Cuba or  Gobierno militar americano en Cuba), was a provisional military government in Cuba that was established in the aftermath of the Spanish–American War in 1898 when Spain ceded Cuba to the United States.

This period was also referred to as the First Occupation of Cuba, to distinguish it from a second occupation from 1906 to 1909. United States Army forces involved in the garrisoning of the island during this time were honored with the Army of Cuban Occupation Medal after its establishment in 1915.

Timeline
1898
 15 February: The USS Maine explodes in Havana harbor.
 20 April: President McKinley signs a congressional joint resolution declaring war against Spain. It includes the Teller Amendment asserting U.S. intentions in declaring war on Spain exclude exercising "sovereignty, jurisdiction or control" over Cuba, "except for pacification thereof".
 10 December: Spain and the United States sign the Treaty of Paris.

1899
 1 January: Military government installed by the United States.
 11 April: Spanish–American War officially ends.

1901
 21 February: Constitution of the Republic of Cuba is adopted.
 31 December: Estrada Palma is elected the first president of the Republic of Cuba.

1902
 20 May: The 1901 constitution takes effect. Birth of the Republic of Cuba.

Platt Amendment
The Platt Amendment defined the terms by which the United States would cease its occupation of Cuba. The amendment, placed into an army appropriations bill was designed to give back control of Cuba to the Cuban people. It had eight conditions to which the Cuban Government needed to adhere before full sovereignty would be transferred. The main conditions of the amendment prohibited Cuba from signing any treaty allowing foreign powers to use the island for military purposes. The United States also maintained the right to interfere with Cuban independence in order to maintain a certain level of protection of life, though the extent of this intrusion was not defined. Most significant, the amendment forced the Cuban Government to sign a treaty officially binding the amendment to law.

The United States reasoning behind the amendment was based on the significant commercial interests held on the island. Spain had previously been unable to preserve U.S. interests and maintain law and order. At the end of military occupation, the amendment served as the primary method of ensuring a permanent presence. Due to the previously enacted Teller Amendment, The United States was forced to grant Cuba its independence after Spanish rule ended. Since the Platt Amendment was successfully incorporated into the constitution in Cuba, influence was maintained without direct U.S. involvement in the country.

See also
 American imperialism

References

History of Cuba
Cuba–United States relations
United States involvement in regime change
Cuba
Banana Wars